The West Indies women's cricket team toured Ireland, the Netherlands and England in June and July 2008. They first played Ireland in 3 One Day Internationals and 1 Twenty20 International, winning both series. The T20I was the first both sides played in the format. They then played a 4 match ODI series and a 2 match T20I series against the Netherlands, again winning both series. The first T20I in the series was the first ever played by the Netherlands in the format. Finally, they played England in 2 ODIs, with one match rained off and the other won by England.

Tour of Ireland

Squads

WODI Series

1st ODI

2nd ODI

3rd ODI

Only T20I

Tour of the Netherlands

Squads

WT20I Series

1st T20I

2nd T20I

WODI Series

1st ODI

2nd ODI

3rd ODI

4th ODI

Tour of England

Squads

WODI Series

1st ODI

2nd ODI

References

External links
West Indies Women tour of Ireland 2008 from Cricinfo
West Indies Women tour of Netherlands 2008 from Cricinfo
West Indies Women tour of England 2008 from Cricinfo

International cricket competitions in 2008
2008 in women's cricket
Women's cricket tours of England
Women's international cricket tours of Ireland
International cricket tours of the Netherlands
West Indies women's cricket team tours